This is a list of Brazilian television related events from 1983.

Events

Debuts
7 March - Balão Mágico (1983-1986)

Television shows

1970s
Turma da Mônica (1976–present)
Sítio do Picapau Amarelo (1977–1986)

Births
4 June - Fernanda Paes Leme, actress, TV host & director
26 November - Sheron Menezzes, actress
14 December - Igor Rickli, actor
16 December - Raphael Viana, actor

Deaths

See also
1983 in Brazil
List of Brazilian films of 1983